Wuhan Hannan General Airport, is an airport for general aviation located in Hannan District, Wuhan. It is the biggest airport in China that handles only general aviation. It is considered a 2B level public airport, able to handle small aircraft such as the Cessna 208. It hosted the World Fly-in Expo 2017.

Construction 

The airport occupies  of land near the Yangtze River. Initial construction took 8 months.

Facilities 
The airport has one single runway with a parallel taxiway. The hangar can park three Boeing 737s, or about 100 small airplanes.

Its runway is 1600 m(5249 ft) long and 30 m(98 ft) wide.

It also has a GA terminal. Parking is available for 11480 cars.

Transport 
 Hannan General Airport station on Line 16 of Wuhan Metro

See also 
 Wuhan Caidian General Airport - another airport for general aviation in Caidian District, Wuhan, currently under construction

References

External links 
 Wuhan Hannan General Airport description on Wuhan Government website

Airports in Hubei